Molly Burhans (born 1989) is an American cartographer, data scientist, and environmental activist. She is the founder of GoodLands, an organization which aims to mobilize the Catholic Church to use its land for environmental and social justice purposes. Burhans was the Chief Cartographer for the first unified digital global map of the Catholic Church in history, which was premiered in the Vatican in 2016. She has further led the development of global Catholic analyses, such as the Church's carbon footprint and conservation potential. She was awarded Young Champion of the Earth by the United Nations in 2019. She is one of Encyclopædia Britannica's 2022 20 Under 40 Young Shapers of the Future in category of academia and ideas. In 2021 the Sierra Club honored Burhans with their EarthCare Award, previously awarded to the likes of Wangari Maathai and Sir David Attenborough. In 2018 she was elected to the Ashoka Fellowship for her innovations in applying new technology to respond to climate change. She was also a National Geographic Emerging Explorer in the class of 2021.

Early life 
Burhans was born in New York City, New York to Debra, a professor of computer science, and William, a researcher in molecular oncology, who died in 2019. Although she attended church as an adolescent, she did not become a practicing Catholic until she was pursuing an undergraduate degree. While visiting a monastery in northwestern Pennsylvania during a weeklong service trip, she observed that the monastery lacked comprehensive land management plans, and began researching the ways that improved land management of worldwide Catholic landholdings could aid environmentalism.

Education 
In 2015, Burhans received a Master's Degree in Ecological Design from the Conway School, where she was a Sustainable Communities Initiative Fellow, and an undergraduate liberal arts degree from Canisius College. She became increasingly interested in the environmental possibilities of mapping and ecologically activating the Catholic Church's global landholdings. She attended high school at City Honors School in Buffalo, NY. She spent time at the GIS software company Esri as a visiting researcher and received a grant from them. Her company, GoodLands, now uses a variety of mapping, planning, and design technologies.

References

American environmentalists
Living people
1989 births
American cartographers
GIS software
People of the Roman Catholic Archdiocese of New York
Christianity and environmentalism
American women environmentalists
Women cartographers
Canisius College alumni
Activists from New York City